Taliperu Project (Telugu:) also known as Taliperu Reservoir is a medium irrigation project constructed across the Taliperu River, a tributary of Godavari River, located at Cherla Village and Mandal, Bhadradri District, Telangana. This project utilizes about 5.0 TMC of water and creates  of Ayacut in both Cherla and Dummugudem Mandals, Bhadradri District.

See also

 Sriram Sagar Project
 Sripada Yellampalli project
 Nizam Sagar
 Kaddam Project
 Pranahita Chevella
 Alisagar lift irrigation scheme
 Sri Komaram Bheem Project
 Icchampally Project
 Lower Manair Dam
 Mid Manair Dam
 Upper Manair Dam

References

Dams on the Godavari River
Dams in Telangana
Irrigation in Telangana
Khammam district
Godavari basin